Colli Aminei is a station on line 1 of the Naples Metro. It was opened on 28 May 1993 as the northern terminus of the inaugural section of Naples Metro, between Vanvitelli and Colli Aminei. On 19 July 1995, the line was extended to Piscinola, and Colli Aminei ceased to be the terminus. The station is located between Policlinico and Frullone.

References

Naples Metro stations
Railway stations opened in 1993
1993 establishments in Italy
Railway stations in Italy opened in the 20th century
Railway stations in Italy opened in the 21st century